On the afternoon of July 16, 2003, George Weller, then age 86, drove his 1992 Buick LeSabre westbound down Arizona Avenue in Santa Monica, California, toward the city's popular Third Street Promenade. The last few blocks of the street, before it ends at the bluffs overlooking Pacific Coast Highway, had been closed to vehicle traffic for the biweekly farmers' market.

The entire sequence of collisions took at least ten seconds.

By the time the car came to a halt, Weller had killed ten people and injured 70. Weller told investigators he had accidentally placed his foot on the accelerator pedal instead of the brake, then tried to brake but could not stop.

On May 22, 2008, the Los Angeles Times reported that the City of Santa Monica had thus far paid out $21 million to settle dozens of civil lawsuits stemming from the case.  The same article also noted that Weller, age 91, was now confined to his home and receiving 24-hour nursing care.

Weller died on December 9, 2010, aged 94.

See also
Sudden unintended acceleration

Notes

External links
 
 
 
 
 
 

History of Santa Monica, California
2003 in California
2003 road incidents
Vehicular rampage in the United States
July 2003 events in the United States